Annette Brander (born 12 January 1993) is an Australian rugby league footballer who plays as a er for the Brisbane Broncos in the NRL Women's Premiership and the Central Queensland Capras in the QRL Women's Premiership. 

She is an Australian and Queensland representative.

Background
Born in New Lambton, New South Wales, Brander moved to Caboolture, Queensland with her family when she was two-years old.

Playing career
In 2010, Brander began playing rugby league for the Caboolture under-18 side and the Sunshine Coast Sirens. In 2012, she joined Brisbane Women's Division 1 side, the Beerwah Bulldogs. In 2014, she made her debut for Australia in their 12-8 loss to New Zealand in Wollongong.

In October 2017, she was named in Australia's 2017 Women's Rugby League World Cup squad, playing four games in the tournament.

2018
In June 2018, she represented Queensland Country at the 2018 NRL Women's National Championships. In July 2018, Brander joined the St George Illawarra Dragons in the NRL Women's Premiership.

In Round 1 of the 2018 NRL Women's season, Brander made her debut for the Dragons in their 4–30 loss to the Brisbane Broncos.

2019
In June 2019, she again represented Queensland Country at the NRL Women's National Championships. Later that month, she signed with the Brisbane Broncos.

2020
On 25 October 2020, she came off the bench in the Broncos' 20–10 Grand Final win over the Sydney Roosters.

2021
In 2021, Brander joined the Central Queensland Capras in the QRL Women's Premiership.

Achievements and accolades

Individual
Karyn Murphy Medal: 2019
QRL Representative Player of the Year: 2019

Team
2017 Women's Rugby League World Cup: Australia – Winners
2019 NRLW Grand Final: Brisbane Broncos – Winners
2020 NRLW Grand Final: Brisbane Broncos – Winners

References

External links
Brisbane Broncos profile

1993 births
Living people
People from South East Queensland
Sportswomen from Queensland
Australian female rugby league players
Australia women's national rugby league team players
St. George Illawarra Dragons (NRLW) players
Rugby league centres
Rugby league second-rows
Rugby league locks
Brisbane Broncos (NRLW) players